The 1980–81 Liga Artzit season saw Beitar Tel Aviv win the title and win promotion to Liga Leumit. Beitar Jerusalem and Maccabi Haifa were also promoted.

Hapoel Hadera, Hapoel Holon and Maccabi Herzliya were all relegated to Liga Alef.

Final table

References
1980–81 Maccabi Haifa 
Liga Artzit table Davar, 24.5.81, Historical Jewish Press 
Liga Artzit table Hadshot HaSport 24 May 1981, IFA

Liga Artzit seasons
Israel
2